Platon Georgitsis is a Greek former sports shooter. He competed in the trap event at the 1960 Summer Olympics.

References

1932 births
Living people
Greek male sport shooters
Olympic shooters of Greece
Shooters at the 1960 Summer Olympics
Sportspeople from Cairo
20th-century Greek people